Sara Ontañón (1907-1968) was a Spanish film editor active from the late 1930s through the 1960s.

Selected filmography 

 La primera aventura (1965)
 Los elegidos (1964)
 Man of the Cursed Valley (1964)
 El balcón de la Luna (1962)
 The Reprieve (1961)
 Días de feria (1960)
 Alfonso XII y María Cristina (1960)
 Con la vida hicieron fuego (1959)
 Dos caminos (1954)
 El cerco del diablo (1952) 
 Cielo negro (1951) 
 La guitarra de Gardel (1949)
 Bambú (1945)
 Lola Montes (1944)
 Eloísa está debajo de un almendro (1943)
 Castillo de naipes (1943)

References 

Spanish film editors
Spanish women film editors
1907 births
1968 deaths